"The Lord's Prayer" is a song written by David Fanshawe for his 1972 choral work African Sanctus.

The song was recorded featuring American-Australian singer Marcia Hines and released in March 1988.
At the ARIA Music Awards of 1989, Hines received a nomination for ARIA Award for Best Female Artist, losing to Kate Ceberano's You've Always Got the Blues.

Track listing
CD (WEA 7-258054)
 "The Lord's Prayer" - 3:08
 "Ring Out the Bells" - 5:00

Vinyl (WEA – 255539-1) 
 "The Lord's Prayer" - 3:08
 "Cattles Songs From Kenya And Uganda" - 3:00
 "African Lamentation" - 1:02
 "The Lord's Prayer" (Choir Version) - 3:12
 "Only a Star" - 1:52
 "Holy Jesus" - 1:30
 "Ring Out the Bells" - 5:00
 "Spoken Introduction/Ring Out the Bells" - 8:02
 "Ring Out the Bells" (Encore) - 3:26

References

Marcia Hines songs
1972 songs
1988 singles